Don R. Eddy (December 16, 1935 – November 5, 2017) was an American college basketball coach, known for his tenure at Eastern Illinois University and as the first head basketball coach for the University of Texas at San Antonio (UTSA).

Eddy played college basketball for Southern Miss. Following his college career, he coached at Southwest High School in Atlanta, then served as an assistant at East Tennessee State. He was hired as head coach at Eastern Illinois in 1968. Eddy coached the Panthers for twelve seasons, compiling a 208–128 record as he guided the program from NCAA Division II to the National Association of Intercollegiate Athletics (NAIA). He led the Panthers to Division II Final Four in 1976 and 1978.

On May 14, 1980, Eddy was announced as the first head coach for UTSA, with the school planning to a field team starting in the 1980–81 season. After compiling a record of 56–54, he resigned following an altercation with a player in a January 26, 1986 game.

After his coaching career, Eddy ran basketball camps in San Antonio and Brenham, Tx. He died on November 5, 2017 at the age of 81.

Season by season results

References

External links
Division I coaching record

1935 births
2017 deaths
American men's basketball players
Basketball coaches from West Virginia
Basketball players from West Virginia
College men's basketball head coaches in the United States
Eastern Illinois Panthers men's basketball coaches
East Tennessee State Buccaneers men's basketball coaches
High school basketball coaches in the United States
People from Kenova, West Virginia
Southern Miss Golden Eagles basketball players
UTSA Roadrunners men's basketball coaches
Guards (basketball)